The 2003–04 ACB season was the 21st season of the Liga ACB.

Regular season

Playoffs

See also 
Liga ACB

External links
 ACB.com 
 linguasport.com 

Liga ACB seasons
 
Spain